Reksa Maulana (born 20 March 1998) is an Indonesian professional footballer who plays as a defensive midfielder for Liga 1 club Dewa United.

Career statistics

Club

Honours

Club 
Dewa United
 Liga 2 third place (play-offs): 2021

International 
Indonesia U16
 AFF U-16 Youth Championship runner-up: 2013

References

External links
 Reksa Maulana at Liga Indonesia
 Reksa Maulana at Soccerway

1998 births
Living people
Indonesian footballers
Bhayangkara F.C. players
Persikad Depok players
Persik Kediri players
Liga 1 (Indonesia) players
Liga 2 (Indonesia) players
Indonesia youth international footballers
Sportspeople from Jakarta
Association football midfielders
Dewa United F.C. players